PAOK FC is a football club based in Thessaloniki, that competes in Super League, the most senior football league in Greece. The club was formed on 20 April 1926 by Greek refugees from Constantinople, and played their first official encounter on 12 December 1926, prevailing 3–1 over Nea Genea Kalamaria. Initially PAOK played against other local clubs in the Macedonia FCA (EPSM). In 1927–28, PAOK took part in the Macedonia FCA 1st Division for the first time. In 1930–31 they qualified for their maiden participation in the Panhellenic Championship. From 1930 to 1959 PAOK played in the Macedonia FCA 1st Division and qualified many times for the final phase of the Panhellenic Championship. 
As of 2013, PAOK is one of only three clubs never to have been relegated from the top level of Greek football, the others being Olympiacos and Panathinaikos.

Key

Key to league:
 Pos. = Final position
 Pl. = Played
 W = Games won
 D = Games drawn
 L = Games lost
 GF = Goals scored
 GA = Goals against
 Pts = Points

Key to rounds:
 W = Winners
 F = Final (Runner-up)
 SF = Semi-finals
 QF = Quarter-finals
 R16/R32 = Round of 16, round of 32, etc.
 PO = Play-off round
 FR = Fourth Round
 3rTh	 = 3rd round thessaloniki's
 GS = Group stage
 AR = Additional Round

Seasons
In 1927, a national championship was organised in the form of a round-robin tournament between the champions of the three governing bodies, Macedonia FCA (EPSM)- Athens FCA (EPSA)- and Piraeus FCA (EPSP). This national championship was set up again in 1929, and over the next years evolved into a tournament in which multiple teams took part. In 1959 the Alpha Ethniki - the precursor of the current Super League - was set up as a national round-robin tournament. 
At present, 16 clubs compete in the Super League, playing each other in a home and away series. The second through fifth place teams in the Super League enter a play-off for the second Greek entry. In the play-off, the teams play each other in a home and away round robin. However, they do not all start with 0 points. Instead, a weighting system applies to the teams' standing at the start of the play-off mini-league. The team finishing fifth in the Super League will start the play off with 0 points. The fifth place team’s end of season tally of points is used to calculate the sum of the points that other teams will have. The point difference of each of the 2nd, 3rd and 4th team from the fifth place team is then divided by five (if the result is a decimal number it is then rounded to a full number, with .5 or more being rounded up) and the resulting number respectively for each team is the number of points with which they will start the mini-league. On 18 August 2017, Super League decided that they will not be held play-offs for 2017-2018.

Notes
A. The Panhellenic Championship not held on 1928-29, 1934–35, 1949–50, and 1951-52.

B. — , (n/a) = Stats missing.

C. x = PAOK did not participate.

References

External links

seasons
Greek football club seasons